Ab-e Barik-e Qowdi is a village in Badghis Province in north-western Afghanistan.

References

External links
Satellite map at Maplandia.com

Populated places in Badghis Province